Amanda Nylander (born 20 April 1990) is a Swedish figure skater. She placed 15th at the 2005 World Junior Championships and 17th at the 2006 World Championships. Her coach was Marie Olsson. She is the twin sister of Isabelle Nylander, who also competed in figure skating.

Programs

Results

References

External links
 

1990 births
Living people
Swedish female single skaters
Sportspeople from Stockholm
21st-century Swedish women